Lin Heung Tea House was a two-storey Chinese restaurant located within the Tsang Chiu Ho Building at 160-164 Wellington Street, at the corner of Aberdeen Street, in Central, Hong Kong. The 100 year old institution closed its doors on 09 August 2022

History
In 1889, Lin Heung Tea House was first founded in Guangzhou, China. At the beginning of the 20th century, there was a proliferation of tea houses in China. In 1926, two branches were opened in Hong Kong: one in Mong Kok, Kowloon and another in Central, Hong Kong Island. In 1980, Lin Heung Tea House moved to the current location and has been located there ever since. Lin Heung Tea House is famous for its authentic and traditional Chinese dim sum, attracting international newspapers coverage including features from CNN and TIME magazine.

Lin Heung Tea House has been featured in several films, including The Longest Summer (1998) and In the Mood for Love (2000).

2022, 8 Aug, Lin Heung Tea House announced its closure via its Facebook page. Local media reported it.  Lin Heung Tea House alleged to owe employees four months’ wage.

Naming
Lin Heung (lit. "fragrant lotus") Tea House is named after the lotus seed paste, an essential ingredient found in Steamed Lotus-seed-paste Bun, mooncake and the Double-lotus Pie. The lotuses used in Lin Heung House are called Xiang-lians and they are imported from Hunan, China. The brown red Xiang-lians are said to give a smooth flavour. After a Hanlin Academy member called Chan Yu Yue visited the Tea House, he really appreciated their lotus paste. As a result, he took the Chinese word of lotus into the Tea House's name.

Interior design
Lin Heung Tea House occupies two floors in a tenement building. While on the ground floor is the Lin Heung Bakery, on the first floor is a Chinese restaurant that serves traditional Chinese dim sum. Traditional Chinese calligraphy and landscape paintings are framed and pinned to the walls.

Services
It has 50 tables and can serve up to 300 patrons. Since there is no host to serve diners in the restaurant, they are required to stand around the tables and get seats for themselves. Waiters will serve diners with cups, a basin for rinsing cutlery and offer them a tally card when they successfully get a seat. Moreover, due to the popularity of the restaurant, diners are expected to share a table.

Tea
Lin Heung Tea House provides a variety of Chinese tea, such as Oolong tea, Pu'er tea, Jasmine tea and Shoumei tea.

The server provides two teacups for each diner: the bigger one for tea making, and the smaller one for drinking. Patrons need to steep tea in the larger cup and pour it into the smaller one.

Water refilling service is provided when the customers open the lid of the larger teacup as an indication that they would like to have their cups refilled. The staff will soon bring along a huge traditional water kettle and pour the hot water.

Traditional trolleys
The dim sum supply is limited and it is served on traditional trolleys. No pre-ordering service is provided. If diners want to get dim sum, they need to follow the trolleys with the tally card. The server will chop a stamp on it after passing the diners their chosen food.

Featured food
Aside from the Lotus-seed-paste Bun, the Tea House offers over 30 kinds of dim sum, including har gow, shumai, cha siu bao. Besides the traditional dim sum where one find in most Chinese restaurants, there are numerous special dishes that can be found only in Lin Heung Tea House. For example, Steamed Chicken Bun, Shumai Made with Liver, Whole Winter Melon Soup, Pa Wong Duck and eight treasures duck

Menu

References

 Lin Heung Tea House Website
 Lee Lai Lai,(2013)〈一盅兩件〉, Retrieved from http://linheung.com.hk/lin_heung_tea_house/index2.php
 Newspaper, (2013)〈蓮香樓踏入第八十個年頭〉, Retrieved from http://linheung.com.hk/uploadfile/news/20130402200151-6.jpg
 Mijune, (2012), HONG KONG – LIN HEUNG TEA HOUSE 蓮香樓 (DIM SUM), Retrieved from http://www.followmefoodie.com/2012/10/hong-kong-lin-heung-tea-house-%E8%93%AE%E9%A6%99%E6%A8%93/
 CNN News, (2009), Lin Heung Tea House: Dim sum elder, Retrieved  from http://travel.cnn.com/hong-kong/eat/lin-heung-679607

External links
 

Central, Hong Kong
Restaurants in Hong Kong